Neottiglossa undata is a species of stink bug in the family Pentatomidae. It is found in North America.

References

Pentatomini
Hemiptera of North America
Insects described in 1832
Taxa named by Thomas Say
Articles created by Qbugbot